Oļģerts Dunkers (Riga, 11 February 1932 – 10 September 1997) was a Latvian actor and film director and politician. He was elected to 6th Saeima (Latvian Parliament) in 1995.

References

External links 

1932 births
1997 deaths
Actors from Riga
People's Movement for Latvia politicians
Democratic Party "Saimnieks" politicians
Deputies of the 6th Saeima
Latvian film directors
Soviet film directors
Latvian male film actors
Soviet male film actors
20th-century Latvian male actors
Film people from Riga